Housing and Building Research Institute (HBRI) is an autonomous organization under Government of Bangladesh Ministry of Housing and Public Works.

History 
The institute was established through the passing of the Housing and Building Research Institutes Act 2016.

Institutional structure
The institute has a total of 153 personnel including 33 qualified research personnel. All activities including R & D programme are now being executed through the following Divisions and Sections:

Divisions
 Structural Engineering and Construction Division
 Building Materials Division
 Soil Mechanics and Foundation Engineering Division
 Housing Division

Sections
 Extension and Dissemination Wing
 Information and Documentation Section
 Administrative & Accounts Section
 Training Cell

References

Building research
Research institutes in Bangladesh
2016 establishments in Bangladesh
Organisations based in Dhaka
Government agencies of Bangladesh